Reverend Bernard Michael Houseal (Bernhard Michael Hausihl) (b. Heilbronn, Wurtemberg, 1727 -  d. Halifax, Nova Scotia, 9 March 1799) was a German Lutheran minister in North America, and the first resident minister of Frederick, Maryland. He preached at the Evangelical Lutheran Church (Frederick, Maryland) (1752) and was the first German minister of Little Dutch (Deutsch) Church in Halifax, Nova Scotia. He was a Loyalist refugee who escaped  New York with his family and slaves.

Career 
He was a student at the University of Strassburg.  He married Sybilla Margaretha Mayer, daughter of Christopher Bartholomew Mayer in the town of Ulm.  They moved to Fredericktown, Maryland and established the Evangelical Lutheran Church (1752-1759).  The building of the church was slowed as a result of the outbreak of the French and Indian War but was still completed before the war ended (1762).  Houseal stayed with the Church for seven years and then moved to Reading, Pennsylvania and served in the Trinity Lutheran Church (1759).  After nine years, he went to Easton, PA (1768).

He then went to New York City (1770) where he was the Senior minister in the Trinity Lutheran Church.  He became a Governor of New York College (present-day Columbia University) and a corporator of the New York Hospital. He was one of the addressers Richard Howe, 1st Earl Howe.  Houseal was an outspoken loyalist and his house and church were burned by the rebels.  After 14 years in New York City, he left for Nova Scotia as a loyalist refugee (1784). Rev. Houseal stayed in New York City until the formal evacuation.  Before he left the Vestry of Trinity church his congregation presented him with a letter that stated:

  We the Subscribers, Members of the Vestry, Elders, Deacons and Trustees of the Antient Evangelical Trinity Church of the City of New York, for ourselves, and in behalf of our whole Congregation, do testify by these presents, that our hitherto beloved minister, the Reverend Bernard Michael Houseal, during his officiating here, for the space of nearly fourteen years ... And whereas the Lord of the Church has called the said our beloved minister to another Station in His Vineyard, we do cordially and thankfully wish and pray the God of all goodness may send His Blessings further with said Mr. Houseal ... with his beloved family to the place of their Destination, are the servant wishes of the Subscribers - New York, 18th November 1783."

During the first year Houseal was in Nova Scotia, he then went to London to be ordained in the Church of England (1785) and while preaching at the Savoy Chapel, Prince Edward requested he become chaplain of his regiment, after which they both came to Halifax.  His son Captain Michael also served as the Duke of Kent's Aide-de-camp and was an author.  Rev. Houseal's preaching was so popular that the congregation outgrew the Little Dutch Church and St. Georges Round Church was built. The Church was completed two years after Houseal died. Houseal is buried beneath the Little Dutch (Deutsch) Church (1799). After his death, Prince Edward arranged for his wife and children to live in England.

Gallery

See also 
Nova Scotia in the American Revolution

References

Further reading 
Bernard Michael Hausihl. Halle Reports, New Ed. p. 426
 Bernard Michael Hausihl. Lutheran Quarterly, Oct., 1883, p. 528

History of Nova Scotia
Loyalists who settled Nova Scotia
1727 births
1799 deaths
18th-century American Lutheran clergy
Canadian Lutheran clergy
People from Heilbronn